The Bücker Bü 181 Bestmann is a two-seater, single-engine aerobatic monoplane aircraft built by Bücker Flugzeugbau in Rangsdorf, near Berlin and extensively used by the Luftwaffe in World War II.

Development
The Bücker Bü 181 was named Bestmann after a German maritime term designating a member of the deck crew on coastal or fishing vessels. The prototype Bü 181 (D-ERBV) made its maiden flight in February 1939 with Chief Pilot Arthur Benitz at the controls. After thorough works and official flight testing by the Reichsluftfahrtministerium (RLM) the Bü 181 was nominated to be the standard primary trainer for the Luftwaffe. Series production of the Bü 181 commenced in 1940. The production types were designated B to C with only slight variations between each, and could be powered by the Hirth HM 500 A or B.

Design

The Bü 181 aircraft was a single-engine low-wing monoplane with fixed undercarriage, split flap, twin controls and two adjustable seats arranged side-by-side. The cabin section of the fuselage was of a tubular steel frame construction whereas the rear of the fuselage had a wooden shell. The wing assembly and tail unit were also of wooden shell construction. All the rudders, elevators and ailerons had wooden ribs and are covered in fabric. The flaps were metallic on the B types and wood on the C types. The Bü 181 Bestmann was powered by a  four-cylinder Hirth HM 500A or B piston engine.
The aircraft was designed for training flights, pleasure trips and aerobatics. Its strength corresponded to Stress Group 5 with a limited load (single occupancy) and Stress Group 4 fully laden.

Production

The Bücker factory at Rangsdorf built most of the Bü 181's, but because of demand was forced to license the design to the Fokker Company in the Netherlands, who subsequently built 373 of the type for the Luftwaffe all of which were delivered by the end of 1943. Production of both the Bü 181B and the slightly modified Bü 181C was begun by Fokker in Amsterdam in 1942 and its total wartime production was 708 aircraft.

The Bü 181 was also built by Zlin Aviation Works plant in Zlin, in the Protectorate of Bohemia and Moravia and after the German withdrawal the production continued after the war at the same Zlin Aviation Works, now denominated  as the C.6 and C.106 for the Czechoslovak Air Force and as the Zlín Z.281 and Z.381 in various versions for civil use. 783 aircraft were built.
Between 1943 and 1945, Hägglund & Söner AB in Sweden built 120 Bü 181's under license with the Swedish military designation Sk 25.

During the 1950s the Heliopolis Aircraft Works of Egypt acquired a Czechoslovakian licence to produce the Zlin Z.381 with a  Walter Minor engine. It was produced for the Egyptian Air Force as the Heliopolis Gomhouria (meaning "Republic") and subsequent versions were supplied to other Arab air forces. At least 300 Gomhourias were built.[1]
In all, 3,400 aircraft were built but only a handful survives today.

Service

Although built primarily as a trainer for the Luftwaffe, the type also performed other duties such as courier & liaison. From March 1945 an order was issued to concentrate all the available Bü 181s to be converted either to the "tank busting" role carrying four Panzerfaust anti-tank grenade launchers from wing-mounted launchers (C-3 subtype), with the launchers mounted on short pylons around halfway out from the wing roots, one below and one above the wing panel on each side anchoring the launchers' firing tubes near their forward ends, with the launchers remotely fired from the cockpit, or to the night harassment role carrying three  bombs (B-3 subtype), most likely inspired by the Soviet female nocturnal Night Witches (Nochnye Vedmy) units' campaigns from 1942 to V-E Day. These units saw very limited use in the final days of the war due to the war situation. However, some missions were carried out, achieving moderate success but at the price of severe losses. One restored Bestmann on the tank buster configuration is on display at the Deutsches Technikmuseum Berlin.

Test pilot and sister-in-law of Claus von Stauffenberg, Melitta Schenk Gräfin von Stauffenberg, was flying a Bücker Bü 181 when she was shot down and fatally wounded in 1945.<ref>info taken from book by Gerhard Bracke, "Melitta Gräfin Stauffenberg, das Leben einer Fliegerin'</ref>

Variants

The Bü 181 evolved very little during the war, the differences between the B type and the C types were minimal, the most important being the increased autonomy of the C types. The main difference between the B-1 & C-1 and the B-2 and C-2 sub-types was the presence of pitot heating and position & cabin lights while the B-2 and C-2 types lacked any electrical system.

Bu 181V Prototype.

Bü 181 B-0	 Pre-production series with Hirth HM 504 A-2 engine

Bü 181 B-1	With Hirth HM 500 A engine

Bü 181 B-2	As B-1 but no electrics

Bü 181 B-3 (Schlachtflugzeug):  Night harassment version made from converted B-1s and C-1s carrying improved instrumentation, Revi gunsights and three ETC 50 bomb racks. Bomb loads; either three SC50 or three SD50 or three SD70 or three AB70 droppable clusters. Max. Bomb load .

Bü 181 C-1  Increased range and Hirth HM 500B engine.

Bü 181 C-2  As C-1 but no electrics

Bü 181 C-3  (Panzerjäger): B-2 or C-2 subtypes modified for the antitank role carrying four wing mounted Panzerfaust 100 single-use antitank grenade launchers in pairs, two on each wing.

Post war license built & developments

Zlín Z.181
Two-seat primary trainer aircraft. Czech production version of the Bu 181, built by Zlín in Czechoslovakia after the war.

Zlín Z.281
Two-seat primary trainer aircraft, powered by a Toma 4 piston engine.

Zlín Z.381
Two-seat primary trainer aircraft, powered by a  Walter Minor piston engine. Czech Air Force designation C-106.

Gomhouria Mk 1
Two-seat primary trainer aircraft, powered by a Walter Minor piston engine. Egyptian production version of the Zlín 381, built under licence in Egypt by the Heliopolis Aircraft Works.

Gomhouria Mk 2
Two-seat primary trainer aircraft, powered by a 145 hp (108 kW) Continental C-145 piston engine. 
Gomhouria Mk 3
As Mk. 2, but with improved undercarriage.

Gomhouria Mk 4
Increased fuel capacity.

Gomhouria Mk 5
Similar to Mk 1, powered by Walter Minor, but with different engine mounting.

Gomhouria Mk 6
Continental O-300 engine.

Sk 25
Swedish Air Force designation of the license-built Bestmann.

Surviving aircraft

Of the over 4,000 Bü 181s originally built, only about 10 examples remain. One restored example of a Gomhouria 181 MK6 in Luftwaffe markings, registration G-TPWX, is known to be airworthy and in flying condition and can regularly be seen airborne over the Welland Valley in South Leicestershire, UK, usually with a chase plane. However a good number of license-built Sk 25s fly still today, as well as some Zlin examples and an increasing number of Egyptian Gomhouria.

Cinema

A Bücker Bü 181 'Bestmann' was used in the movie The Great Escape.  It was flown in the movie by James Garner with Donald Pleasence as his passenger.

Military operators
 
 Algerian Air Force – 12 Gomhourias delivered, starting in 1962
 
 Bulgarian Air Force
 
 Air Force of the Independent State of Croatia
 
 Czechoslovak Air Force – postwar
 Czechoslovakian National Security Guard – postwar
  
 Egyptian Air Force – 150 Gomhourias
 
 Luftwaffe
  
 Hungarian Air Force – postwar.
 
 Royal Jordanian Air Force – Gomhouria
 
 Libyan Air Force (1951-2011) – two Gomhourias donated by Egypt in 1962
 
 Royal Moroccan Air Force - several Gomhourias donated by Egypt in the early 1960s.
  
 – Postwar.
 
 Slovak Air Force (1939–45)
 
 Royal Romanian Air Force
 
 Somali Air Force - two Gomhourias received in 1960
 
 Sudanese Air Force – four Gomhourias
 
 Swedish Air Force 
 
 Swiss Air Force – 1 + 6 Bü-181B-1 from German Luftwaffe landed and were interned in 1944.
 
 SFR Yugoslav Air Force – postwar

Specifications

See also

Notes

Bibliography

 
 
 Donald, David and Lake, Jon. (editors). Encyclopedia of World Military Aircraft. London: Aerospace Publishing, Single volume edition, 1996. .
 König, Erwin. Bücker Bü 181 "Bestmann" (Flugzeug Profile 30) (in German). D-86669 Stengelheim, Germany: Unitec Medienvertrieb e.K. 
 König, Erwin. Die Bücker-Flugzeuge (The Bücker Aircraft) (bilingual German/English). Martinsried, Germany: Nara Verlag, 1987. .
 König, Erwin. Die Bückers, Die Geschichte der ehemaligen Bücker-Flugzeugbau-GmbH und ihrer Flugzeuge (in German). (1979)

 Mondey, David. The Hamlyn Concise Guide to Axis Aircraft of World War II. London: Chancellor Press Ltd, 1996. .
 Smith, J.Richard and Kay, Antony L. German Aircraft of the Second World War. London: Putnam and Company Ltd., 3rd impression 1978, p. 94–96. .
 Taylor, John W. R. Jane's All The World's Aircraft 1965–66. London: Samson Low, Marston, 1965.
 Wietstruk, Siegfried. Bücker-Flugzeugbau, Die Geschichte eines Flugzeugwerkes (in German). D-82041 Oberhaching, Germany: Aviatik Verlag, 1999. .
 Wood, Tony and Gunston, Bill. Hitler's Luftwaffe: A pictorial history and technical encyclopedia of Hitlers air power in World War II''. London: Salamander Books Ltd., 1977, p. 140. .

External links

Aviation Fans
"Net-Maquettes" Bücker Bestmann walk around
Account of Bü 181s used as Panzerknacker tankbusters, armed with Panzerfaust anti-tank grenade launchers

Bu 181 Bestmann, Bucker
Single-engined tractor aircraft
Low-wing aircraft
Bücker aircraft
Aircraft first flown in 1939